Blind Boxer is a 1972 Hong Kong kung fu film.

References

External links
 IMDb entry

1972 films
Hong Kong action films
1970s action films
Mandarin-language films
Kung fu films
1970s Hong Kong films